Magi: The Kingdom of Magic is a Japanese anime television series and a sequel to Magi: The Labyrinth of Magic, based on the manga series of the same title written and illustrated by Shinobu Ohtaka. It was broadcast in Japan on MBS from October 6, 2013 to March 30, 2014. For the first part, the opening theme song is "Anniversary" by SID and the ending theme song is "Eden" by Aqua Timez, while for the second part, the opening theme song is "Hikari" by ViViD and the ending theme song is "With You/With Me" by 9nine.

Aniplex collected its twenty-five episodes in a total of nine DVD and Blu-ray sets, which were released from January 22 to November 26, 2014.

The series is licensed in North America by Aniplex of America. They released the series in two DVD sets on March 1 and May 26, 2015. A complete Blu-ray box set was released on June 27, 2017.


Episode list

References

2013 Japanese television seasons